Paul McCartney is an English musician who has recorded hundreds of songs over his career of more than sixty years. As a member of the Beatles, he formed a songwriting partnership with his bandmate John Lennon that became one of the most celebrated in music history. Some of McCartney's famous Beatles compositions include "Hey Jude", "Penny Lane", "Let It Be" and "Yesterday", the last of which being one of the most covered songs of all time. After the band's break-up, he recorded his 1970 lo-fi album McCartney, which he composed and performed alone, containing songs including "Maybe I'm Amazed". It was followed by his first solo single, "Another Day", and Ram (1971), which he recorded with wife Linda McCartney. For the remainder of the 1970s, McCartney released music with the rock band Wings, recording many of his well-known songs, including "Live and Let Die", "Jet", "Band on the Run", "Listen to What the Man Said", "Silly Love Songs", "Let 'Em In" and "Mull of Kintyre". Wings went through numerous line-up changes, but were primarily composed of the core trio of the McCartneys and English musician Denny Laine. Before the break-up of Wings in 1981, McCartney recorded the 1979 Christmas song "Wonderful Christmastime" and his second solo album, McCartney II (1980), which showcased a new wave, synth-pop and electronica style, evident on "Coming Up" and "Temporary Secretary". Like his first solo album, he composed and performed it alone. In 2020, McCartney released McCartney III, which he composed, performed and produced alone, like its two predecessors.

Following the break-up of Wings, McCartney released his third solo album, Tug of War, in 1982, which featured contributions from Stevie Wonder ("Ebony and Ivory" and "What's That You're Doing") and Carl Perkins ("Get It") and the song "Here Today", a tribute to former Beatle John Lennon after his murder in December 1980. Around this time, McCartney collaborated with Michael Jackson on "The Girl Is Mine" from Jackson's 1982 album Thriller and again a year later on "Say Say Say" and "The Man" on McCartney's album Pipes of Peace. His next single, "No More Lonely Nights", featured a guitar solo from Pink Floyd guitarist David Gilmour. Other individuals with whom McCartney has collaborated include English producer Hugh Padgham (Press to Play), English musicians Elvis Costello (Flowers in the Dirt) and Jeff Lynne (Flaming Pie), American producer David Kahne (Driving Rain and Memory Almost Full), and English producer Nigel Godrich (Chaos and Creation in the Backyard). In the 2010s, McCartney has recorded music with American rapper Kanye West ("Only One", "FourFiveSeconds" with Rihanna, and "All Day"), the surviving members of Nirvana ("Cut Me Some Slack"), and American producers Greg Kurstin and Ryan Tedder (Egypt Station).

In addition to writing his own songs, McCartney has recorded cover versions of songs throughout his career, most notably on CHOBA B CCCP (1988), Run Devil Run (1999), and Kisses on the Bottom (2012). He also produced Thrillington, an instrumental cover album of Ram in the jazz and lounge genres under the name Percy "Thrills" Thrillington. In addition to rock and pop music, McCartney has experimented with different genres since the 1990s. He has released five albums in the classical music genre, beginning in 1991 with Liverpool Oratorio up until 2011's Ocean's Kingdom, based on the ballet of the same name; he experimented with orchestral music on Working Classical (1999) with the London Symphony Orchestra. He collaborated with producer Youth under the name the Fireman, recording three electronica albums: Strawberries Oceans Ships Forest (1993), Rushes (1998) and Electric Arguments (2008). Another electronica release was Liverpool Sound Collage (2000) with Super Furry Animals and Youth. McCartney also wrote and performed "Hope for the Future", the ending song for the 2014 video game Destiny.

Songs

Classical pieces
McCartney has recorded five classical albums since 1991, including two with the London Symphony Orchestra. All pieces produced by John Fraser.

See also
List of songs recorded by the Beatles

Notes

References

Bibliography
 
 
 
 
 

McCartney, Paul